Helge Christian Bronée (28 March 1922 in Nybølle – 3 June 1999 in Dronningmølle) was a Danish footballer who played four games for the amateur Denmark national football team. He moved abroad in 1948 to play professionally for French club FC Nancy, as well as Italian clubs Palermo, AS Roma, Juventus, and Novara. Adverse to any form of discipline, he was known as the playboy of European football.

Biography

Amateur years
Bronée started playing football with Copenhagen clubs Boldklubben 1893 (B 93) and Handelsstandens Boldklub (HB). He moved to Østerbro Boldklub (ØB) in 1939, where he formed a fearsome attacking partnership as a centre forward alongside inside forward Karl Aage Præst. Though rarely in top shape, Bronée was the born athlete and a great gymnast. With 26 goals in the 1945–46 Danish 2nd Division season, Bronée helped ØB win promotion for the top-flight Danish 1st Division. Bronée got his debut for the Danish national team in September 1945, where he scored the first goal in a 5–1 victory against Norway. In all, he played four games and scored one goal for Denmark. He was the topscorer of the 1946–47 Danish championship with 21 goals in 18 games, as ØB finished in fourth place in their 1st Division debut season. He moved abroad to play professionally in 1948. Due to the Danish Football Association's strict rules of amateurism, this spelled the end of his international career after four games and one goal for the national team.

Professional career
Bronée signed a contract with French team FC Nancy, and played in the club for two seasons. The life of a professional footballer improved his physical condition, as he had been slightly chubby when playing in Denmark. In 1950, he moved on to Italian football. He played two years at Palermo, in the midtable of the top-flight Serie A championship. In 1952, he moved on to AS Roma, with whom he finished in sixth place of the Serie A for two seasons in a row. Bronée was reunited with Karl Aage Præst, when he played a single season for Juventus, with another sixth place the result. He moved to relegation battlers Novara in 1955. Despite 10 goals from Bronée, Novara's 1955–56 season resulted in relegation.

During his professional career, Helge Bronée never stayed long at the same club. He was a single-minded player, adverse to tactical discipline. Off the field, he liked the high life, and was known as the playboy of European football. However, his many transfer moves always included large fees, as he had the capability to turn any game in his favor, provided he was in the right mood.

Bronée moved back to Denmark in 1956, but the Danish Football Association (DBU) barred him and other ex-professionals from playing in the amateur-only Danish leagues. The ex-professionals began playing a series of unofficial, but popular, exhibition matches, centered around Karl Aage Præst's vacation home in Liseleje. In 1958, DBU decided to allow ex-professionals into Danish football following a two-year quarantine. Bronée played for Rødovre BK, before ending his career with his first senior club, B 93.

References

External links
 Danish national team profile
  Haslund.info profile

1922 births
1999 deaths
Danish men's footballers
Denmark international footballers
Denmark under-21 international footballers
Association football midfielders
Boldklubben af 1893 players
FC Nancy players
Palermo F.C. players
A.S. Roma players
Juventus F.C. players
Novara F.C. players
Ligue 1 players
Serie A players
Danish expatriate men's footballers
Expatriate footballers in France
Expatriate footballers in Italy
Danish expatriate sportspeople in France
Danish expatriate sportspeople in Italy